Piranlu may refer to:
 Piranlu, Ardabil
 Piranlu, East Azerbaijan
 Piranlu, Razavi Khorasan